Tai-Kai Ng is a physicist from Hong Kong.

Ng earned his bachelor's degree from the University of Hong Kong, then graduated from Northwestern University with a doctorate. He returned to Hong Kong for a professorship at the Hong Kong University of Science and Technology. In 2000, Ng was elected a fellow of the American Physical Society "[f]or his work on the Coulomb effects in a quantum dot, leading to the prediction of conductance enhancement due to the Kondo resonance."

References

Hong Kong expatriates in the United States
Hong Kong physicists
Living people
Alumni of the University of Hong Kong
Academic staff of the Hong Kong University of Science and Technology
Year of birth missing (living people)
Fellows of the American Physical Society
Northwestern University alumni